Dar Eshkut (also Romanized as Dar Eshkūt; also known as Dar Eshkū and Darreh Eshkū) is a village in Qaleh Rural District, in the Central District of Manujan County, Kerman Province, Iran. At the 2006 census, its population was 33, in 6 families.

References 

Populated places in Manujan County